Luis Vargas Peña (1905 in Asunción–1994) was one of the greatest Paraguayan footballers (wingers) before the Second World War. He was the first Paraguayan to score a goal for the Paraguay national football team in a FIFA World Cup, accomplishing that in a match valid for the group stage of the 1930 FIFA World Cup against Belgium, played on 10 July. Vargas Peña also had the honour of being the first captain for Paraguay in a World Cup.

During most of his career he played for the club Olimpia Asunción.

International goals
Paraguay's goal tally first

Sources 
 A.Gowarzewski : "FUJI Football Encyclopedia. World Cup FIFA*part I*Biographical Notes – Heroes of Mundials" ; GiA Katowice 1993
 http://fifaworldcup.yahoo.com/06/en/w/pwc/mr_1089.html
 http://www.cbc.ca/sports/soccer/teams/paraguay.html

1905 births
1930 FIFA World Cup players
1994 deaths
Sportspeople from Asunción
Paraguayan footballers
Club Olimpia footballers
Paraguay international footballers
Association football forwards